St Patrick's Athletic Football Club is a professional Irish association football club based in Inchicore, Dublin, that plays in the Irish Premier Division. Founded in May 1929, they played originally in Phoenix Park but they moved to their current ground Richmond Park in 1939.

St Patrick's Athletic have won many trophies in Irish Club Football, including eight League Titles, the fifth most in Irish Football, as well as four FAI Cups and four League Cups. The current manager is Tim Clancy, who took over in December 2021.

The club graduated through the ranks of the Leinster Senior League and duly took their place in the League of Ireland in 1951, and won the Championship at their first attempt. The club's glory years came in the 1950s and 1990s when they won 6 of their 8 league titles. The club also have the record for never having been relegated from the Premier Division. The club play in red and white colours and their nicknames include The Saints, Supersaints and Pats. The Saints also have a lot of Dublin Derby games with the likes of Shelbourne, Shamrock Rovers, and Bohemians.

History

Leinster Senior League years
During the late 1940s and 1950s, St Pats played in the Leinster Senior League. During this period they won the league title on six occasions. This included four successive titles between 1947 and 1948 and 1950–51. In 1947–48 St Pats completed a treble after also winning both the FAI Intermediate Cup and Leinster Senior Cup. The 1948–49 season would see St Pats win a Leinster Senior League / FAI Intermediate Cup double. In 1950–51 a young Shay Gibbons helped St Pats win the Leinster Senior League title for the fourth time. After St Pats first team joined the League of Ireland in 1951–52, their reserve team won two further Leinster Senior League titles in 1955–56 and 1956–57.

1950–1960

Entering the League of Ireland
In 1951–52 the club was admitted, along with Cork side Evergreen United, to the League of Ireland. St Pats made an immediate impact, winning the league championship at their first attempt. Two more league championship successes followed in 1954–55 and 1955–56. The club had to wait until 1959 before their first FAI Cup success, repeating the feat in 1961. Despite several appearances in the final since 1961, it took the Saints till 2014 to win their third

Many of the Pats players of that golden era are still recalled fondly today—Ginger O'Rourke, Harry Boland ('The Legend', 1926–2000), Jimmy 'Timber' Cummins (a cousin of one of the founders—Bart Cummins) Jimmy 'Growler' Cummins (a brother of Bart Cummins) Irish international Shay Gibbons, Ronnie Whelan Snr. and Willie Peyton are players who contributed greatly during this era.

1960–1980
St Pats struggled throughout the late 1960s, 1970s and early 1980s with only the odd cup final or young star emerging to brighten things for long-suffering Pats fans. Among those players to emerge was Noel Campbell. Campbell spent a number of years with St Pats (gaining the first of his Irish caps) before moving to SC Fortuna Köln where he would play 8 seasons. Perhaps the brightest star to play for St Pats was Paul McGrath. McGrath was signed by Saints manager Charlie Walker from junior side Dalkey United. Within a year he had won the PFAI Player of the Year award and earned himself a move to Manchester United. The World Cup-winning goalkeeper Gordon Banks also played one match for St Pats, making him by far the brightest star to turn out for the club in 1977.

1980–1990
The appointment of Brian Kerr as manager in 1986 was a major turning point in the fortunes of the club. Kerr worked on limited resources to create a team capable of challenging the best. The championship in the decade. At the end of the 1988–89 season, St Pats left Richmond Park for what the board of directors called "a short time" while redevelopment work was done. 1989 saw a joint St Patrick's Athletic & Bohemians side play a friendly against the Libya national team in Tripoli, drawing 1–1 in what was a highly controversial friendly during Colonel Gaddaffi's reign as leader of Libya.
The year 1990 saw the Saints draw 0–0 with the Tunisia national team in Tunis and another 0–0 draw with the Iran national football team in Tehran.

1990–1999
Playing in Harold's Cross, Kerr's blend of young players (Paul Osam, Curtis Fleming, Pat Fenlon, John McDonnell) and experienced campaigners disregarded by other clubs (Damian Byrne, Dave Henderson) won the club's first league championship in 34 years on Easter Monday 1990. Most Irish football commentators expected the young Saints to dominate Irish football for some time. A series of takeover attempts saw the club thrust into turmoil and Kerr was forced to break up the team. In the summer of 1992, the club were hours away from extinction before a group of local investors raised £82,000 to save the club.

Having spent four years in Harold's Cross the club returned to a new look Richmond Park in 1993, their spiritual home in Dublin's Inchicore. Brian Kerr began the task of creating a winning setup once again. With the aid of a newly appointed Chief executive, and former player, Pat Dolan and by the club's new chairman, Tim O'Flaherty, the league trophy returned to Richmond Park in 1996.

A new generation of footballing heroes emerged in Pats colours with greats such as Eddie Gormley, Paul Osam and Ricky O'Flaherty together with exciting young stars such as Colin Hawkins and Trevor Molloy thousands flocked to Inchicore for Friday nights under the floodlights in Richmond Park. When Kerr resigned to take up the Director of Coaching job with the FAI, the good work was continued by Pat Dolan and then Liam Buckley installed as manager. The glory continued as further league championships were secured in 1998 and 1999 which led to European qualification and a creditable 0–0 draw with the famous Celtic at Celtic Park, the club lost the return leg in Tolka Park, Dublin but the away draw was a major boost for Irish football against such a famous club in the world game. The club, however, suffered a humiliating setback in the same competition one year later when they lost 10–0 on aggregate to Zimbru Chişinău.

2000–2004
Into the new century, the success continued. St Pats won both the League of Ireland Cup and Leinster Senior Cup in 2000/01. Controversy dogged the club in the 2001/02 season due to player registration irregularities. The club had 9 points deducted due to fielding an ineligible player (Paul Marney) in their first 3 games of the season, but this decision was revoked upon arbitration, on 22 March 2002. They then had 15 points deducted for playing Charles Mbabazi Livingstone in the first 5 matches of the season in spite of not having registered him until 12 September 2001. An FAI arbitration panel rejected the Saints' appeal against the point deduction and Shelbourne finished the season as league champions. That season also saw St Patrick's come close to merging with fellow League of Ireland club St. Francis. This move was greeted with anger by club supporters and although St. Francis went out of business (and therefore the league) the merger never happened.

New club chairman Andrew O'Callaghan was appointed in the summer of 2002 and has worked to modernize the club and face the new challenges of UEFA licensing and ground development. St Pats made Irish footballing history in 2002 by becoming the first club to progress in the Intertoto Cup with a victory over Croatian team NK Rijeka over two legs—the club were eventually knocked out of the competition only on away goals to KAA Gent of Belgium.

Johnny McDonnell Reign (2004–2009)

The club marked its 75th anniversary in 2004, also in 2004, a change of management happened with former favourite Johnny McDonnell taking over the helm at the club. In 2005 the club were forced to investigate the idea of sharing a new stadium in Tallaght with Shamrock Rovers in order to comply with the FAI's wish for Dublin clubs to ground share. The move was met with furious protests by the club's supporters and a group calling themselves 'Pats for Richmond' was set up to organise demonstrations. In July 2006 St Pats signalled their intention to stay in Richmond Park by purchasing the Richmond House pub (also known as McDowell's) for use as an official clubhouse. The club lost yet another FAI Cup Final in December 2006 and their hunt for their third victory in the elusive competition continues. In early 2007 the club was purchased by a wealthy property magnate Garrett Kelleher. After a number of months of negotiations, Kelleher finally announced himself as Chairman of St Patrick's Athletic on 19 July 2007. One of his first acts on taking over St Pats was to appoint ex-manager Brian Kerr as director of football. It was widely reported in Irish newspapers that Kelleher was preparing to spend €50 million on upgrading St Pats' Richmond Park home. 
During the 2007 season Pats were neck and neck with Drogheda United for the title, but Pats slipped away and Drogheda United eventually finished up as champions.
It was the same again for the 2008 season with Pats battling up the top with Bohemians for the title. Also, this year Pats were in Europe because their second-place finish in 2007 allowed them to qualify for the 2008–09 UEFA Cup. During their European run St Pats progressed through two rounds of the UEFA Cup beating JFK Olimps Riga and Elfsborg but the run came to an end when they lost to Hertha BSC in the First Round proper. Pats also lost out to Bohemians for the league title.

Jeff Kenna season: European run and domestic struggle (2009)

For the 2009 season Pats replaced Johnny McDonnell with Jeff Kenna in January 2009. He didn't have the best of starts with a 3–0 home defeat to his former club Galway United. He was immediately put under pressure when a bad run of results put them into a relegation battle. Despite the poor league form, once again Pats had another European run in the Europa League again progressing through two rounds of the Europa League, thus becoming only the second League of Ireland club (after Cork City in 2004 and 2005) to achieve such progress in two consecutive European campaigns. Pats this time won games against Valletta FC and Russian Premier League side Krylia Sovetov to reach the play-off round where they were defeated by FC Steaua București.
In September 2009 with Pats struggling, Kenna resigned and was replaced for two games by Maurice O'Driscoll. Pete Mahon then took over until the end of the season and avoided relegation, winning two must-win games in the final two weeks of the season, away to Drogheda United and at home to Dublin rivals Shamrock Rovers.

Pete Mahon years (2009–2011)
Pete Mahon was appointed as manager for the 2010 season with John Gill as his assistant. The Super Saints reached their first Setanta Sports Cup final, where they met local rivals Bohemians after overcoming Sligo Rovers 6–2 over two legs. They lost the final at the Tallaght Stadium 1–0, however. The Saints were knocked out of the FAI Cup by archrivals Shamrock Rovers in a semi-final replay at Richmond Park, after knocking Dundalk, Belgrove and Sporting Fingal out. They were near the top of the table for the majority of the season; however, fell off somewhat near the end and finished in mid-table. The demise of Sporting Fingal saw the Saints take their European place for the 2011 season. Mahon led a successful Europa League campaign, knocking out Íþróttabandalag Vestmannaeyja from Iceland and FC Shakhter Karagandy from Kazakhstan before eventually being knocked out in the third qualifying round by Ukrainian side FC Karpaty Lviv. The Saints won the 2011 Leinster Senior Cup after beating Dublin rivals Bohemians 2–0 at Dalymount Park. The Saints' bid to end their 50-year drought of winning the FAI Cup came to an end, after knocking Crumlin United, Waterford United and Cork City out, the Saints faced old rivals Shelbourne in the semi-final. The Saints drew 1–1 at Tolka Park, failing to make use of their one-man advantage for the whole second half. The game went to a replay at Richmond Park and things were going well when David McMillan opened the scoring for the Saints, but goalkeeper Gary Rogers was extremely harshly sent off early on and Shels went on to win, 3–1. Similar to the 2010 season, the Saints were near the top of the table for the most part of the season in 2011, but their title challenge petered out towards the end of the season and the Saints finished fourth meaning they would participate in UEFA Europa League qualifiers in the 2012 season.

Return of Liam Buckley: Return of success (2012–2018)

The Saints decided not to renew manager Pete Mahon's contract for the 2012 season, appointing former player and manager Liam Buckley to the job, giving him a two-year contract with former player and assistant manager at the club, Trevor Croly as his assistant. Buckley refurbished the squad by bringing in fourteen and getting rid of sixteen. Among the new signings were six Bohemian players, notably Chris Forrester, Christy Fagan, and Ger O'Brien. Meanwhile, six of those not retained by Pats went in the opposite direction, an indication of the change in circumstances at both clubs.

Buckley immediately introduced a more attractive brand of football than was witnessed under Mahon, whose sides had generally punched above their weight but ultimately lacked the quality to seriously challenge for the title. Pats started the season off well with the team playing wonderful football and being unbeaten in its first six games, which included the game against Shamrock Rovers which they demonstrated their wonderful football brilliantly in a 5–1 win over their fierce rivals. Buckley took the reins of the club knowing of the European expectations at the club and he didn't disappoint, managing his side to a third qualifying-round place after knocking both Íþróttabandalag Vestmannaeyja and NK Široki Brijeg out after extra time, to earn a tie with German powerhouse Hannover 96, who knocked the Saints out in the third qualifying round. Buckley's side finished 3rd in the league, 6 points off champions Sligo Rovers. He also guided his side to the 2012 FAI Cup Final, the club's first game at the Aviva Stadium, but lost 3–2 in extra time to Derry City and extending the Saints' FAI Cup-winning drought to 52 years.

The Saints then endured a tumultuous pre-season, losing Sean O'Connor, James Chambers, and Barry Murphy, as well as Buckley's number two, Trevor Croly, to rivals Shamrock Rovers. Crucially, though, Pats held on to a number of other players who had been strongly linked with Rovers, including Chris Forrester and Ian Bermingham, and added some quality to the first XI in the form of Killian Brennan (who would go on to win both the PFAI Players' Player of the Year and FAI National League Player of the Year awards), and Conan Byrne (who contributed an impressive 9 league goals during the season).

St Patrick's Athletic clinched the 2013 League of Ireland title on 13 October 2013 after a 2–0 win against holders Sligo Rovers with two games to spare. They lifted the league trophy a week later at home to Derry City on 18 October and two days later played the 2013 Leinster Senior Cup Final against Shamrock Rovers, losing, 1–0, at Richmond Park.

The 2014 season started off with silverware for the Saints as they beat Sligo Rovers 1–0 in the inaugural President of Ireland's Cup, with Keith Fahey scoring a brilliant volley into the top corner from 25 yards clinching the trophy. The club crashed out of the UEFA Champions League at the first hurdle in the second round, bowing out to Legia Warsaw. In the first leg, they were denied a famous away win as Legia equalised in injury time to claim a 1–1 draw. An injury-plagued Pats side lost the second leg 5–0 at Tallaght Stadium, conceding 3 in the last 10 minutes.
On 9 September 2014, a team of second-string players and young Saints beat Longford Town 2–1 away from home to win the 2014 Leinster Senior Cup with Sam Verdon and Jack Bayly scoring.
The season ended in a perfect manner for Pats as they won the FAI Cup after a 53-year wait with a 2–0 win over Derry City at the Aviva Stadium, with Christy Fagan immortalising himself with the club's fans by scoring a brace. Fagan also won the 2014 League of Ireland Golden Boot with 20 goals as well as being voted the PFAI Player of the Year for 2014.

On 19 September 2015, the Saints won their third League of Ireland Cup, beating Galway United on penalties at Eamonn Deacy Park following a 0–0 draw after extra time, with young goalkeeper Conor O'Malley saving Andy O'Connell's final spot-kick to win the cup.

In 2016 the Saints knocked Jeunesse Esch of Luxembourg out of the UEFA Europa League on away goals before being narrowly beaten 2–1 on aggregate to Dinamo Minsk of Belarus in the second qualifying round. Pats finished 7th in the 2016 season, meaning they would be without European football for the first time in 7 years for 2017. They did, however, successfully retain their League of Ireland Cup crown, beating Limerick 4–1 in the final at the Markets Field with two goals from Conan Byrne and one each for Jamie McGrath and Graham Kelly.

The 2017 season was the first in a change of the League of Ireland layout, meaning the bottom three teams in the Premier Division would be relegated in order to make the league a 10-team division rather than a 12-team one. The season turned out to be a struggle for the Saints and they sat bottom of the table at the halfway point. The mid-season signings including fan favourite Killian Brennan, former Premier League midfielder Owen Garvan and particularly Dutch centre back Jordi Balk, proved to be pivotal as the club went on to win 6 of their last 11 games after picking up just 3 wins in their first 21 games of the season. They went into the last day of the season in need of a point away to Derry City, which they earned via a 1–1 draw with a goal from Killian Brennan keeping their record of never having been relegated intact.

The following season was a great improvement on the field as Pats sat in a European place at the halfway point in the league but later went on their worst losing streak in the club's history as they lost 8 games in a row, scoring just 3 goals along the way. They then managed to pick up their form, winning 4 out of 6 games but on 22 September 2018 the Saints suffered a 3–1 loss at home to a weakened Bohemians side with several of their under-19 side playing among the 11 changes to their previous starting 11. This turned out to be Liam Buckley's last game in charge of the club as it was announced on 25 September that Buckley had left his post by mutual consent after a 7-year spell in charge of the club.

Assistant manager to Buckley and former club captain Ger O'Brien took caretaker charge for the last 5 games of the season, the first of those being the Leinster Senior Cup Final which they lost on penalties against Shelbourne at Tolka Park. He also saw out a draw away to champions Dundalk and had an aggregate score of 9–0 against Limerick and Derry City as the club ended the season on a high note in 5th place.

The Harry Kenny months (October 2018 – August 2019)
On 24 October 2018 it was announced that Harry Kenny (who had been assistant manager in the 2013 league-winning campaign) would be the new manager of the club, signing a two-year contract. His new signings ahead of the 2019 season were Gary Shaw, David Webster, Ciaran Kelly, Cian Coleman, Georgie Poynton, Brandon Miele, Michael Drennan, Rhys McCabe and old fan favorite Chris Forrester, stating that his aim was to get the club back competing in European competition. Kenny's first competitive game in charge of the Saints was on 15 February 2019, a 1–0 opening-day victory over league runners-up Cork City at Richmond Park, with the game attracting the biggest attendance at a domestic game since October 2010. This was followed by a sell-out against rivals Shamorck Rovers on 8 March. On 25 April 2019 it was announced that the club had been awarded a licence to compete in UEFA Europa League action for the 2019–20 campaign ahead of Waterford, who had finished one place ahead of Pats in fourth place the previous season, but were not awarded a licence due to their club reforming in late 2016 and thus breaking UEFA's 'three-year rule'. Pats drew IFK Norrköping of Sweden and were beaten 2–0 at home and 2–1 away, knocking them out at the first hurdle. With the team scoring just 24 goals in 29 games and attendances steadily dropping, fans became restless with Kenny and after a shock cup exit to UCD on 23 August 2019, Kenny resigned by mutual consent the following day.

Stephen O'Donnell reign & FAI Cup win (August 2019 – December 2021)

Former Dundalk captain Stephen O'Donnell was announced as the head coach on a two-year contract on 31 August 2019, his first job in senior management, following the resignation of Harry Kenny. His brought in his former Arsenal youth and Falkirk teammate (and former Pats player) Pat Cregg as his assistant. His first game in management came on 6 September 2019 as his Pats side came from behind to win 2−1 away to Finn Harps thanks to goals from Darragh Markey and substitute Rhys McCabe. The club finished in 5th place by the end of the season, missing out on a UEFA Europa League place but they did however win the 2018–19 Leinster Senior Cup, beating Wexford 3–0 in the Fourth Round (under Harry Kenny), Cabinteely 1–0 in the Quarter Final, with Under 19's manager Jamie Moore managing a side made up of Under 15, Under 17 and Under 19's players in the Semi Final (beating Sheriff YC 3–1 away) and Final (beating Athlone Town 4–0), as both games were scheduled after the senior team's season had finished.

O'Donnell's first pre-season saw him make wholesale changes to the squad, releasing 10 players including some who were still in contract and bringing in 9 new signings; Jason McClelland, Robbie Benson, Conor Kearns, Rory Feely, Shane Griffin, Billy King, Dan Ward, Martin Rennie and Ollie Younger. The season was hit by the COVID-19 pandemic after 4 games and following 4 months of postponements, a decision was made to half the season from 36 games to 18. The season finished in disappointment for Pats as they missed out on European football on the final day of the season, while they had previously been knocked out of the FAI Cup in the First Round by Finn Harps.

The 2021 season was a hugely successful one for the club, as they secured a 2nd place finish, securing UEFA Europa Conference League football for 2022, as well as winning the 2021 FAI Cup by beating Bohemians in a penalty shootout in the Final, in front of an Aviva Stadium FAI Cup Final record crowd of 37,126.

Tim Clancy era (December 2021 – Present)
On 2 December 2021, just 4 days after the club's 2021 FAI Cup Final win, it was announced that Tim Clancy had joined the club on a 2 year contract to replace the outgoing Stephen O'Donnell, whose controversial departure to Dundalk had yet to be confirmed amid a legal battle between the clubs. In late December 2021 a High Court action was filed against O'Donnell by the club.

On 26 January 2022, it was announced that the club had sold academy graduate James Abankwah to Italian Serie A side Udinese for an undisclosed fee believed to a record fee paid for a League of Ireland player, in the region of €800,000 plus add ons.

On 2 May 2022, it was announced that the clubs would enter the 2022–23 UEFA Europa Conference League at the Second Qualifying round, rather than the First, following UEFA's decision to ban Russian clubs from competing in their competitions for the season.

Clancy's first taste of managing in European football came with a 1–1 draw at home to Slovenian side NŠ Mura. The second leg saw his side advance 6–5 on penalties following a 0–0 draw after extra time. The next round saw Pat's beat Bulgarian side CSKA Sofia 1–0 away before suffering the heartache of a 2–0 loss in the second leg at Tallaght Stadium following a controversial late penalty.

Kits

Home kits

The club's first kit was a red shirt with a white collar and a white chevron, with white shorts and red socks. Since then they have changed to a kit of a red jersey with white sleeves, white shorts and red socks, rarely changing from this format.

Away kits

The most frequent away colours used by Pats are navy/blue but over the years they have ventured outside of the ordinary.

Third kits

The club have released some dedicated third kits in recent years, while in years that they haven't, they've usually used the previous seasons away kit as a third kit.

Kit manufacturers and sponsors

Fans

Saints fans have widely become known as some of the most active and vocal throughout the country. Throughout the club's history, any period of turmoil was always met with protest by the loyal saints. In 2001, an ultras group called the Shed End Invincibles were set up, for four years they created huge tifo displays, choreographed chants and created Richmond Park into a fortress. After a period of exile, the ultras group were reignited under new leadership. Since then, their work has been applauded by other fans. Big banners, flares, and smoke screens are a common sight at St Pats matches. Overseas visitors are regularly found at Richmond Park on a match night, including a Norwegian Pats' supporters club. As well as this, the club's supporters share friendships with supporters of clubs such as Ravenna from Italy, Sheffield United of England, and Hannover 96 of Germany. Fans of these clubs, along with Pats fans, regularly travel to one another's matches. Famous fans include former Irish manager Brian Kerr and American actor Wendell Pierce.

Community

The club motto is Ní neart go cur le chéile (as Gaeilge). It translates to No strength without unity. St Patrick's Athletic is strongly linked with Inchicore and the local southwest Dublin community. In 2020 the club used Richmond Park as a hub for a food bank to provide supplies to the vulnerable. Such is the club's dedication to embedding itself in the community, they employ a full time Community Officer who runs a long list of programmes such as the educational Primary School Community Programme in local schools.

Women's Football

In 1996 St Patrick's Athletic F.C. took over the local women's football team O'Connell Chics. The most notable former player is Emma Byrne who is the record appearance holder for the Republic of Ireland Women's National Team, with the Saints being Byrne's first senior club.

In 2022, club legend Ian Bermingham was appointed as Football Partnership Manager between St Patrick's Athletic and Cherry Orchard and part of the partnership, the club will be progressing with their plans to field a team in the Women's National U17 League from the 2023 season onwards.

First-team squad

Technical staff

Youth structure
The club field an Under-19, an Under-17, an Under-15 and an Under-14 team that compete in the League of Ireland U19 Division, League of Ireland U17 Division, League of Ireland U15 Division and League of Ireland U14 Division respectively.

NUI Maynooth Scholarship Scheme
Set up in 2010, St Patrick's Athletic have a scholarship scheme in place with NUI Maynooth. The scheme allows Pats to offer young players the opportunity to play with the club's Youth sides whilst undergoing their third-level studies on a sports scholarship. There is a big St Pats influence in the scheme with the Soccer Development Officer at Maynooth being former Pats defender Barry Prenderville as well as club captain Ger O'Brien managing the side to their first-ever Collingwood Cup win in 2014, with teammate Brendan Clarke as his assistant. The scholarship scheme is a big asset to St Pats, as it helps attract the top young talent in the country to the club ahead of their rivals. The scheme has also been a huge success, with the Saints Under-19s side winning the Dr. Tony O'Neill Cup in 2015 to become the best side in the country, as well as a whole host of players graduating from the Youth Setup into the First Team squad. Among the top players to have come through the Programme are Jake Carroll, Seán Hoare, Jamie McGrath, Darragh Markey, Ciaran Kelly, Paul Rooney and Fuad Sule among others.

Youth Club Affiliations
In 2016, the club opted to disband their own youth teams that played in the Dublin & District Schoolboys Leagues, moving forward into a new model for the League of Ireland Under-19, Under-17 and up-and-coming Under-15s leagues. Pats struck up Affiliations with 4 of Ireland's top schoolboy clubs Crumlin United, Belvedere, Cherry Orchard and Esker Celtic in the best interest of both clubs and their players/facilities. On 1 March 2016, the Saints announced an Affiliation Agreement with the local side Crumlin United, one of the country's top schoolboy clubs, to improve Pats Youth Setup while also benefiting Crumlin and their young players. On 29 March 2017, the Saints announced an official partnership with Belvedere. On 24 May 2017 St Patrick's Athletic announced an official partnership with local Ballyfermot side Cherry Orchard. On 13 July 2018 St Patrick's Athletic announced an official partnership with Lucan side Esker Celtic.

Cherry Orchard partnership
In June 2022, it was announced that a new football partnership had been made between Pat's and Cherry Orchard which would see the clubs work together exclusively, with the aim of the partnership to provide players from Cherry Orchard with a pathway to the academy and to senior League of Ireland football for both boys and girls, with Pat's also creating a new full-time Football Partnership Manager role to oversee the partnership.

Honours
League of Ireland: 9
 1951–52, 1954–55, 1955–56, 1989–90, 1995–96, 1997–98, 1998–99, 2001–02, 2013
FAI Cup: 4
 1958–59, 1960–61, 2014, 2021
League of Ireland Cup: 4
 2000–01, 2003, 2015, 2016
President of Ireland's Cup: 1
 2014
League of Ireland Shield: 1
 1959–60
Dublin City Cup: 3
 1953–54, 1955–56, 1975–76
FAI Super Cup: 1
 1999–2000
LFA President's Cup: 6
 1952–53, 1953–54, 1955–56, 1971–72, 1990–91, 1996–97
Leinster Senior Cup: 9
 1947–48, 1982–83, 1986–87, 1989–90, 1990–91, 1999–2000, 2010–11, 2013–14, 2018–19
FAI Intermediate Cup: 3
 1947–48, 1948–49, 1952–53
Leinster Senior League: 6
 1947–48, 1948–49, 1949–50, 1950–51, 1955–56, 1956–57
FAI Junior Cup: 1
 1940–41
FAI Youth Cup: 1
 1944–45
Dr Tony O'Neill Cup: 2
 2000–01, 2014–15
FAI Futsal Cup: 1
 2008

Notable players

Internationals
Republic of Ireland internationals

League of Ireland XI representatives

Republic of Ireland B internationals

Republic of Ireland U23 internationals

Republic of Ireland U21 internationals

Other internationals

Award winners
PFAI Players' Player of the Year;

PFAI Young Player of the Year

 Colin Hawkins (1997–98)
 Mark Quigley (2007)
 Chris Forrester (2012)

SWAI Goalkeeper of the Year

 Brendan Clarke (2013)

League of Ireland Player of the Year;

 Colin Hawkins (1998)
 Paul Osam (1999)
 Killian Brennan (2013)

League of Ireland Player of the Month

Harry Boland Hall of Fame 

Notes

St Patrick's Athletic Player of the Year

League of Ireland Top Goalscorer
League of Ireland Top Scorer

Records
St. Pats Full League Record
P 2062 W 860 D 535 L 666 F 2996 A 2655 Pts 2710

Statistics are correct up to 7/11/2022 
Above points tally is the number of points earned in real terms. In most seasons the league used a 'two points for a win', system.
If using a straight 'three points for a win, one for a draw', system, St Pats would have earned 3117 points.

Record League Points Tally 73 in season 1998–99 (33 games)
Record League Goals Tally 66 in season 2014 (33 games)
Record League Victory 8–0 (h) v Limerick (10 December 1967)
Record FAI Cup Victory 8–0 (h) v Pike Rovers (21 May 2016)
Record League Cup Victory 5–1 v Athlone Town (13 October 1985)
Record Leinster Senior Cup Victory 7–0 (h) v Tolka Rovers (9 February 2015)
Record League Goal scorer Shay Gibbons – 108 goals
Record League Goal scorer in one Season Shay Gibbons – 28 goals in 1954–55
Record Goal scorer in Europe Christy Fagan – 6 goals
Record Goal scorer in Europe in one season Declan O'Brien – 4 goals in 2009
Record Total Appearances Ian Bermingham – 454 appearances
Record League Appearances Ian Bermingham – 354 appearances
Record FAI Cup Appearances Ian Bermingham – 39 appearances
Record European Appearances Ian Bermingham – 24 appearances
Youngest Player Mason Melia – 15 years 132 days (31 January 2023 vs Wexford in the Leinster Senior Cup)
Youngest League Player Sam Curtis – 15 years 255 days (13 August 2021 vs Waterford in the League of Ireland Premier Division)
Youngest Goalscorer Mason Melia – 15 years 132 days (31 January 2023 vs Wexford in the Leinster Senior Cup)

Source:

League of Ireland Placing History

European record

Overview
As of 11 August 2022

Matches

Notes
 (a): (Away goals rule)
 (aet): (After Extra Time)
 1R: First round
 2R: Second round
 PR: Preliminary round
 1Q: First qualifying round
 2Q: Second qualifying round
 3Q: Third qualifying round
 PO: Play-off round

Managers

 Alex Stevenson (1954–58)
 Shay Keogh (1963–65)
 George Lax (1965–66)
 Gerry Doyle (1966–67)
 Peter Farrell (1967–68)
 John Colrain (1968–71)
 Jack Burkett (1971–75)
 George Richardson (1975–76)
 Barry Bridges (1976–78)
 Ralph O'Flaherty (1978–79)
 Charlie Walker (1979–84)
 Eoin Hand (1984–85)
 Jimmy Jackson (1985–86)
 Brian Kerr (1986–96)
 Pat Dolan (1996–98)
 Pete Mahon (1998)
 Liam Buckley (1998–99)
 Pat Dolan (1999–03)
 Eamonn Collins (2003–04)
 John McDonnell (1 March 2004 – 10 January 2009)
 Jeff Kenna (14 January 2009 – 18 September 2009)
 Maurice O'Driscoll (interim) (Sept 18, 2009 – 22 September 2009)
 Pete Mahon (interim) (23 September 2009 – 8 December 2009)
 Pete Mahon (9 December 2009 – 1 December 2011)
 Liam Buckley (2 December 2011 – 25 September 2018)
 Ger O'Brien (interim) (25 September 2018 – 26 October 2018)
 Harry Kenny (24 October 2018 – 24 August 2019)
 Stephen O'Donnell (31 August 2019 – 2 December 2021)
 Tim Clancy (2 December 2021 – Present)

Manager records

References

External links
St Patricks Athletic FC Official Website
SaintsForum.net (Discussion forum for All Saints fans)
St. Patrick's Athletic FAI Cup history

 
Association football clubs in Dublin (city)
Association football clubs established in 1929
League of Ireland Premier Division clubs
1929 establishments in Ireland
Former Leinster Senior League clubs